HaMerotz LaMillion 1 is the first season of HaMerotz LaMillion (lit. The Race to the Million), an Israeli reality television game show based on the American series The Amazing Race. The first installment of the series features 10 teams of two with a pre-existing relationship in a race around the world to win ₪1,000,000.

This season premiered on 5 February 2009 on Channel 2 with the finale on 11 June 2009 and was hosted by Raz Meirman.

Business partners Shay Kahana and Guy Osadon were the winners of this season.

Production

Development and filming

On 8 April 2008, Disney-ABC International Television announced that it granted the license for Reshet to produce an Israeli version of The Amazing Race.

Much like the American and Asian franchises, route markers were colored yellow and white in Vietnam to avoid confusion with the former flag of South Vietnam. Differing from most of the other franchises of the series, the last leg was not filmed back-to-back with the previous legs. On 30 May 2009, months after the penultimate leg had been filmed and during the broadcast of the actual show, teams were flown to the final destination to film the final leg. The theme song was also different than the original American version's theme song with Israeli-style music.

Graham Keating, Sydney's famous town crier, served as the Pit Stop greeter during Leg 8. He previously appeared as a greeter during The Amazing Race 2.

Casting
The cast for this season included retired beauty queens Liran Kohner and Elena Ralph as well as the son of singer Ilanit, Amichay Gat.

Maya & Amichay separated not long after the season aired, and Maya married Israeli actor Ron Shahar, who would become the show's new host in 2011, on 28 August 2010. The couple had one daughter and separated April 2019.

Future appearances 
In 2014, Maya Kramer competed with future HaMerotz LaMillion host Ron Shahar on the game show Raid the Cage.

Results
The following teams participated in this season, with their relationships at the time of filming. Note that this table is not necessarily reflective of all content broadcast on television due to inclusion or exclusion of some data. Placements are listed in finishing order:

Key
A  team placement indicates that the team was eliminated.
A  indicates that the team won a Fast Forward.
A  team placement indicates that the team was the last to arrive at a Pit Stop in a non-elimination leg.
An  placement indicates that the team was forced to relinquish all of their money and belongings (except for passports and the clothes on their back) for the remainder of the season. In addition, they were not allotted money for the next leg and were not allowed to collect money until the next leg started for them.
An  placement indicates that the team was "marked for elimination"; if the team did not place 1st in the next leg, they would receive a 30-minute penalty.
A  indicates that the team chose to use the Yield;  indicates the team who received it.
A  indicates that the team chose to use a U-Turn;  indicates the team who received it.

Notes

 Hadas & Inbal left the Pit Stop in Vũng Tàu in last place at the start of Leg 5 because they accidentally slept in.
 Hannah & Margalit were unable to complete the leg because Margalit was hospitalized due to a severe abdominal infection that she began suffering during the flight to Tokyo. Raz Meirman met them at the hospital, where they were eliminated.
 Tom & Gil initially arrived 4th, but took a taxi instead of walking to the Pit Stop. They were forced to go back to the Orient Hotel and then walk back to the Pit Stop. This did not affect their placement.
 Hadas & Inbal had been "marked for elimination"; however, since they arrived last, they were eliminated without being issued the 30-minute penalty.

Prizes
Leg 1 – A stay at an authentic hunting lodge during the Pit Stop, while all other teams slept in tents.
Leg 2 – A stay at a luxurious suite during the Pit Stop, where delicacies and wine would be served.
Leg 3 – A massage for each team member during the Pit Stop.
Leg 4 – A Vietnamese meal served during the Pit Stop, which the winners could invite another team to join them.
Leg 5 – A traditional Japanese massage for each team member at local hot springs during the Pit Stop.
Leg 6 – A stay at a luxurious suite in The Venetian Macao during the Pit Stop, while all other teams slept at a simple hotel.
Leg 7 – A Harel Relax credit card loaded with $6000, which the winners could use during the Pit Stop to purchase souvenirs and gifts to send back home.
Leg 8 – A stay at a luxurious suite at the Hilton hotel during the Pit Stop, plus a limo ride to a restaurant to enjoy a high-quality dinner for two.
Leg 9 – A phone call home, which could optionally be donated to another team.
Leg 10:
1st Place – ₪1,000,000 from Harel and two Honda Civic hybrid vehicles
2nd Place – A European spa vacation.
3rd Place – A summer vacation in Israel.

Race summary

Leg 1 (Israel → South Africa)

Airdates: 5 & 12 February 2009
Kfar Truman, Central District, Israel (Avenue Hall) (Starting Line)
Central District (Ben Gurion Airport – Terminal 3 Issta Stand)
 Tel Aviv (Ben Gurion Airport) to Port Elizabeth, South Africa (Port Elizabeth International Airport)
Port Elizabeth (Kragga Kamma Game Park)
Nomathamsanqa (Fruit Stand)
Tsitsikamma National Park (Tsitsikamma Falls Adventures) (Overnight Rest) 
Garden Route National Park (Khoisan Village)
 Garden Route National Park (Bloukrans Bridge)
Stormsrivier (Storms River Mouth) 

In Water, teams had to rappel down a waterfall and add up the three numbers posted on the side to receive their next clue. In Sky, teams had to ride a frightening zip-line to receive their next clue.

In this series' first Roadblock, one team member had to perform the world's highest bridge bungee jump off of the Bloukrans Bridge to receive their next clue.

Additional tasks
In Ben Gurion Airport, teams had to find an Issta stand and randomly pick one of ten envelopes containing tickets for one of two flights to Port Elizabeth, each with seats for five teams and arriving two hours apart.
After landing in Port Elizabeth, teams had to find a marked car with their next clue instructing them to drive to Kragga Kamma Game Park, follow a marked course over swamps, attach a log to their car using a rope, then drag the log with their car to the end of the course to receive their next clue.
In Nomathamsanqa, each team member had to carry a basket of fruit on their head to the Sangoma without dropping anything to receive their next clue.
At the Khoisan Village, teams had to throw a tribal weapon known as an "Intonga" to break a pot held up by rope to receive their next clue.
At Storms River Mouth, teams had to correctly build a tent to sleep in for the night before they could run to the Pit Stop.

Leg 2 (South Africa)

Airdates: 19 & 26 February 2009
 Port Elizabeth (Port Elizabeth International Airport) to Cape Town (Cape Town International Airport)
 Cape Town (Table Mountain)
 Paarl (Nelson Wine Estate or Valley Gun Club)
Atlantis (Atlantis Dunes)
 Cape Town (Killarney Motor Racing Complex)
Cape Town (Langa – Rubber Cash Store)
Cape Town (Langa – Tabani Street)
Cape Town (Victoria & Alfred Waterfront – Nobel Square)
Cape Town (Rhodes Memorial) 

In Wine Road, teams had to drive themselves to Nelson Wine Estate and bring an empty barrel uphill to a wine vat. In Through the Sight, teams had to drive themselves to Valley Gun Club. There, one team member had to launch clay targets while their partner had to use a shotgun to shoot down six targets to receive their next clue.

In this leg's Roadblock, one team member had to drive a Formula One car on the Killarney race track and complete four laps with an average lap-time of two minutes or less to receive their next clue. If team members could not complete the task within the allotted time, then they had to serve a five-minute penalty before making another attempt.

Additional tasks
At Atlantis Dunes, both team members had to slide down the dune on a sandboard through a set of flags at the bottom of the dune to receive their next clue.
At Rubber Cash Store, the shopkeeper would give teams a bag of Epsom salt and their next clue, which instructed teams to pick up two "Smileys" (sheep heads) outside the store and bring them to Tabani Street. There, teams had to eat a roasted head to receive their next clue.
At Nobel Square, teams had to perform a local gumboot dance with a troupe of dancers and earn R30 to receive their next clue.

Leg 3 (South Africa → Vietnam)

Airdates: 5 & 7  March 2009
 Cape Town (Cape Town International Airport) to Ho Chi Minh City, Vietnam (Tan Son Nhat International Airport)
Ho Chi Minh City (Bến Thành Market)
 Cai Lậy (Mr. Tư Hải's Rice Field)
Cái Bè (Tân Vinh Restaurant) 
Cái Bè (Bằng Chicken Farm)
Cái Bè (Cái Bè Land Market)
Mỹ Tho (Trại Rắn Đồng Tâm) 
Ho Chi Minh City (Nha Tian Theatre)
Ho Chi Minh City (Saigon Zoo and Botanical Gardens) (Unaired)
Ho Chi Minh City (Hùng Vương Temple) 

In Swamp, teams had to complete a swamp obstacle course to retrieve their next clue. In Jump, teams had to cross a river by jumping across five large lily pad-shaped floating platforms without falling into the water to receive their next clue.

For this series' first Fast Forward, one team had to travel to Tân Vinh Restaurant, where they would discover that each team member had to eat a serving of roasted vole to win the Fast Forward award.

In this leg's Roadblock, one team member had to collect five snakes from an enclosure and transport them into a nearby bucket to receive their next clue.

Additional tasks
At Bến Thành Market, teams had to sell 30 flower bouquets to locals on bicycles and earn at least 150,000₫ to receive their next clue.
At Bằng Chicken Farm, teams had to gather 20 live chickens and then deliver them using a đòn gánh to a vendor in the land market to receive their next clue and a duck, which they would had to bring with them to the Pit Stop.
At Nha Tian Theatre, teams had to watch a fan dance and unscramble Hebrew letters on the performers' fans ( – "Wine enters, secret goes out.") to receive their next clue.

Leg 4 (Vietnam)

Airdates: 12 & 14 March 2009
Ho Chi Minh City (Nguyễn Thông Motorcycle Shop)
 Ho Chi Minh City (Mien Dong Coach Station) to Bà Rịa
Bà Rịa (Ruộng Lúa Hợp Tác Xã Quyết Thăng) 
Vũng Tàu (Vũng Tàu Market)  
 Vũng Tàu (Ao Sen Cô Phương)
Vũng Tàu (Vũng Tàu Promenade Park)
Vũng Tàu (Trần Hưng Đạo Temple)
 Vũng Tàu (Hạ Long Street Promenade to Villa Blanche ) 

In this leg's Roadblock, one team member had to choose a water buffalo and then lead it to plough a muddy rice paddy in a slalom pattern past a series of posts before returning to the start to receive their next clue. Team members were taught beforehand some common vocal commands to help control their carabao but had to start over if they asked for help.

In Water Boats, teams had to paddle basket boats across the river to retrieve a dangling clue. In Pedal Feet, teams had to pedal bikes laden with shrimp baskets  to a house where they would receive their next clue.

Additional tasks
At the Nguyen Thong Motorcycle Shop, teams had to assemble a motorcycle using an assembled motorcycle for reference to receive their next clue.
At Vũng Tàu Market, teams had to correctly count the number of sardines in a basket to receive their next clue.
At Vũng Tàu Promenade Park, teams had to correctly perform a traditional dance known as múa sạp, which involves jumping over bamboo sticks in time, to receive their next clue.
At Tran Hung Dao Temple, teams had to solve a large Tower of Hanoi puzzle to receive their next clue.
At Ha Long Street Promenade, one team member had to transport their partner to the next Pit Stop on a cyclo.

Leg 5 (Vietnam → Japan)

Airdates: 19 & 26 March 2009
 Ho Chi Minh City (Tan Son Nhat International Airport) to Tokyo, Japan (Narita International Airport)
 Narita (Narita Airport Terminal 2·3 Station) to Tokyo (Shibuya – Shibuya Station)
Tokyo (Shibuya – Shibuya Scramble Crossing)
Tokyo (Shibuya – J-Pop Cafe)
Tokyo (Shibuya – Geinu Kodansha School) 
 Tokyo (Shinjuku – Shinjuku Station) to Gotemba (Gotemba Station)
Gotemba (Forest) 
Gotemba (Mother Village)
 Yamanakako (Lake Yamanaka – The Big Swan) 

In Teach, teams had to teach a schoolchild who did not speak Hebrew to memorize ten Hebrew words. If the child could pass a test from a local teacher, teams would receive their next clue. In Learn, teams had to learn ten Japanese words from a local schoolchild and pass a test from a local teacher to receive their next clue.

In this leg's Roadblock, one team member had to pass through three rows of archways, going through the correct archway in each row, to receive their next clue. If they entered an incorrect archway, they were sent back to the beginning by ninjas. If team members passed through 3 wrong archways, they would be sent to the back of the line of racers waiting to complete the task.

Additional tasks
At the Shibuya Scramble Crossing, teams had to find their next clue on one of the large screens, which would instruct them to find a geisha wearing a pink kimono who would give them their next clue.
At the J-Pop Cafe, teams had to search among women with Harajuku style clothing for one with a specific kanji character on her clothing to receive their next clue.
At Mother Village, teams had to endure a seven-minute pedicure treatment given by baby piranhas and then solve a puzzle box encompassing their next clue.
At Lake Yamanaka, teams had to pedal a swan boat to the Pit Stop, The Big Swan.

Leg 6 (Japan → Macau)

Airdates: 2 & 4 April 2009
 Tokyo (Narita International Airport) to Freguesia de Nossa Senhora do Carmo, Macau, China (Macau International Airport)
Freguesia da Sé (Senado Square)
Freguesia da Sé (Kun Iam Statue)
Freguesia da Sé (Sai Van Lake) (Overnight Rest)
 Freguesia da Sé (Macau Tower)
 Freguesia de Nossa Senhora de Fátima (Edificio Fabril Veng Kin) or Freguesia de Nossa Senhora do Carmo (Rua do Cunha)
Freguesia de Santo António (Fortaleza do Monte)
Zona do Aterro de Cotai (The Venetian Macao) 

In this leg's Roadblock, one team member had to walk around the outer rim of the Macau Tower observation deck and then perform the SkyJump by falling  in a controlled descent from the 61st floor of the Macau Tower to receive their next clue.

In Noodles, teams had to use traditional methods to flatten and cut dough into three acceptable bundles of Chinese noodles to receive their next clue. In Cookies, teams had to bite into 2,000 almond cookies until they found one cookie with meat in it to receive their next clue.

Additional tasks
At Senado Square, teams had to take a dragon head sculpture, travel to Kun Iam Statue to find a dragon tail sculpture, then take both sculptures to Sai Van Lake to find their next clue. 
At Sai Van Lake, teams had to put their dragon sculptures on a dragon boat and complete a lap of the lake in the boat to receive their next clue.
After the Roadblock, teams had to find a Mini Moke parked nearby with their next clue.
At Fortaleza do Monte, teams were given a key and had to find which of the 1000 locks it opened to receive their next clue.
At The Venetian Macao, teams had to ride a gondola to the Pit Stop.

Leg 7 (Macau → Hong Kong)

Airdates: 16 & 23 April 2009
 Freguesia da Sé (Outer Harbour Ferry Terminal) to Central and Western District, Hong Kong (Hong Kong–Macau Ferry Terminal)
Wan Chai District (Yee Wo Street)
Wan Chai District (Cosmo Hotel)
 Wan Chai District (Southorn Stadium)
Sham Shui Po District (Lai Chi Kok Park) 
Central and Western District (Ko Shing Market)
Kowloon City District (Kowloon Walled City Park) 
Kowloon City District (Commander Rock) 
Wong Tai Sin District (Wong Tai Sin Temple)
Sha Tin District (Ten Thousand Buddhas Monastery) 

In this leg's Roadblock, one team member had to play ping-pong against a junior champion and score seven points to receive their next clue.

For this season's second Fast Forward, one team had to travel to Lai Chi Kok Park, where they would discover that they had to perform a Buddhist tradition of completely shaving their heads to win the Fast Forward award.

In Kung Fu, teams had to learn a series of kung fu stances and perform them for the kung fu master. Then, both team members had to break a stack of seven clay tiles with one punch to receive their next clue. In Lion Dance, teams had to learn a lion dance, find a local master, and correctly perform the dance while in a lion costume to receive their next clue.

Additional tasks
On Yee Wo Street, teams had to find the answers to five questions: The number of squares on the logo of PCCW (12). The number of triangles on the logo of Sogo (2). The price of the South China Morning Post (7). The number of arches on the bridge (17). The missing number in the elevator of Cosmo Hotel (4).
In the Cosmo Hotel, teams had to go to a marked room and use the numbers from the previous task in a calculation to find the number that opens a safe (1748) containing their next clue and a Harel Relax credit card, which they had to bring to the Pit Stop.
At Ko Shing Market, teams had to find ingredients for a snake soup, bring them to a pharmacist, and consume two bowls of soup to receive their next clue.
At Wong Tai Sin Temple, teams had to hear their future from one of three types of fortune tellers (phrenology, face reading, or kau chim) to receive their next clue.
At the Ten Thousand Buddhas Monastery, teams had to correctly count the number of Buddha sculptures with only one hand visible (54) to check into the Pit Stop.

Leg 8 (Hong Kong → Australia)

Airdates: 30 April, 7 & 14 May 2009
 Chek Lap Kok (Hong Kong International Airport) to Sydney, New South Wales, Australia (Sydney Airport)
Sydney (Dawes Point)
Sydney (Woolloomooloo – Harry's Cafe de Wheels) (Overnight Rest)
Sydney (Sydney Harbour Bridge)
Sydney (Sydney Olympic Park – Acer Arena)
  Sydney (Sydney Olympic Park – Sydney Olympic Park Aquatic Centre or Sydney Circus Arts School)
Sydney (Sydney Olympic Park – The Sprinter Sculpture) 
 Sydney (City Centre – Circular Quay Ferry Wharf to Manly – Manly Wharf)
Sydney (Manly – Manly Beach)
Sydney (Hilton Hotel) 
Sydney (The Rocks – Australian Heritage Hotel)
Sydney (The Rocks – Argyle Pub)
Sydney (The Rocks – Orient Hotel)
Sydney (Royal Botanical Gardens) 

For both Detour options, teams had to don leotards and travel by Segway to their chosen task. In Water Dance, teams had learn and perform a synchronized swimming routine to receive their next clue. In Sky Roll, both team members had to perform a flying trapeze maneuver known as a "catch" to receive their next clue.

In this leg's Roadblock, one team member had to perform a face-first rappel from the roof of the Hilton hotel to receive their next clue.

Additional tasks
At Dawes Point, teams had to use binoculars to find the name of their next destination marked with two Amazing Race flags.
At Harry's Cafe de Wheels, teams had to eat six meat pies, each of which had 1,000 calories, to receive their next clue and a departure time for the next morning.
At Sydney Harbour Bridge, teams had to learn the "Aussie Aussie Aussie, Oi Oi Oi" cheer, don provided New Balance shoes, climb over the top of the bridge, and reiterate the cheer to receive their next clue.
At Manly Beach, teams had to find a "Sheila" in an "Aussie cossie", a woman wearing a swimsuit with a design of the Australian flag on it, to receive their next clue.
At Australian Heritage Hotel, both team members had to pour three cups of beer and carry them on a tray to the Argyle Pub. There, both team members had to pour three more cups of beer and deliver them to the bartender at the Orient Hotel without spilling the beer past a red line to receive their next clue.
From the Orient Hotel, teams had to make their way by foot to the Pit Stop.

Leg 9 (Australia → New Zealand)

Airdates: 14 & 21 May 2009
Sydney (Issta Travel Agency)
 Sydney (Sydney Airport) to Auckland, New Zealand (Auckland Airport)
Auckland (Westhaven Marina)
Matamata (Hobbiton Movie Set) (Overnight Rest)
 Matamata (Shire's Rest Farm)
Rotorua (Te Puia) 
 Rotorua (Rotorua International Stadium or Pikirangi Village)
Rotorua (Hell's Gate)
Auckland (One Tree Hill) 

In this leg's Roadblock, one team member had to herd three sheep into a small fenced area to receive their next clue.

In Snatch, teams had to play Rugby against three professional Rugby players. They had to run with the ball  without coming into contact with the rugby players or letting the ball touch the ground. Then, one team member had to kick the ball through the goalposts to receive their next clue. In Catch, teams had to learn and correctly perform a Māori stick game known as titi torea to receive their next clue.

Additional tasks
At the Issta travel agency, teams would receive tickets for one of two flights, each carrying two teams and arriving a half-hour apart.
At Auckland Airport, teams had to find a Maui campervan, which would serve as their transportation for this leg, with their next clue.
At Westhaven Marina, teams had to prepare a yacht for sailing so that it matched example yacht to study to receive their next clue from the skipper.
At the Hobbiton Movie Set, teams had to find two items from The Lord of the Rings film trilogy (Gandalf's staff and the One Ring) and bring them to Gandalf to receive their next clue.
At Te Puia, the male team members had to receive their next clue from a Māori warrior.
In Hell's Gate, teams had to enter the mud pools and find two Māori totems, which they could exchange for their next clue.

Leg 10 (New Zealand)

Airdates: 4 & 11 June 2009
 Auckland (Auckland Airport) to Queenstown (Queenstown Airport)
Queenstown (Shotover River)
Gibbston (Peren Farm)
Queenstown (The Bakery)
Queenstown (Lake Hayes)
Queenstown (Deer Park Heights) (Overnight Rest)
Queenstown (Queenstown Airport – Actionflite) 
Gibbston (Kawarau River)
Gibbston (Dennis' Farm)
Nevis River (Nevis Highwire Platform) 
 Otago (Black Rock Valley) 

In this season's final Roadblock, one team member had to ride in an airplane with a stunt pilot, enduring wild moves with heavy g-forces, to receive their next clue.

The task at the Nevis Highwire Platform was presented as an additional task, but it was actually a Detour. In the one aired choice,  (Leqefotz 'Yeched – Jump Together), both team members would be harnesses together and had to swing above the Nevis Canyon to receive their next clue.

Additional tasks
At Queenstown Airport, teams had to search for a marked Toyota Land Cruiser Prado with their next clue.
At Shotover River, teams had to ride on an extreme jet boat and grab their next clue hanging along the way.
At Peren Farm, teams had to search through 50 hay bales to find one of only five with their next clue.
At The Bakery, teams had to decorate four Pavlovas and then sell them for a combined total of NZ$50 to receive their next clue.
At Lake Hayes, teams had to cut five pieces of wood with a two-man saw together and two pieces from each team member. They then had to use them to correctly answer nine multiple-choice questions about the season to receive their next clue. The questions were:
Where did you experience the highest free fall in the world? (Macau)
What is the local nickname for the African delicacy of sheep head? (Smiley)
What was the name of the town where you met Gandalf? (Matamata)
What was the name of the traditional wooden weapon of the Khoisan tribe? (Intonga)
What was the name of the flower market where you sold flowers in Ho Chi Minh City? (Bến Thành Market)
What command will make a carabao turn left? (Hee)
What was the combination of the safe in Hong Kong? (1748)
What was the name of the meat pie from Harry's Cafe de Wheels? (Tiger Pie)
What is the nickname for the unique street fashion worn in the fashion district of Tokyo? (Harajuku).
At Kawarau River, teams had to go riverboarding down the river to receive their next clue.
At Dennis' Farm, one team member had to answer eight questions about the season's teams, and their partner had to match the answers to receive their next clue.
{|class="wikitable" style="text-align:center"
|-
!rowspan=2|Questions
!colspan=3|Answers
|-
!Maya & Amichay
!Shay & Guy
!Tom & Gil
|-
!Who is the untrustworthy team?
|Michal & Ran
|Michal & Ran
|Michal & Ran
|-
!Which team is overrated?
|Hadas & Inbal
|Hadas & Inbal
|Maya & Amichay
|-
!Which team are you most jealous of?
|Maor & Asher
|Hannah & Margalit
|Hadas & Inbal
|-
!Which of the three teams does not deserve to be in the finals?
|Tom & Gil
|Tom & Gil
|Maya & Amichay
|-
!Which team should have reached the finals?
|Michal & Ran
|Michal & Ran
|Michal & Ran
|-
!Which team has the best relationship with each other?
|Maor & Asher
|Shay & Guy
|Tom & Gil
|-
!If the race was a foursome, which team would you pair up with?
|Shay & Guy
|Maya & Amichay
|Shay & Guy
|-
!Which team argued the most?
|Eliana & Yael
|Alen & Inbal
|Alen & Inbal
|-
|}
In Black Rock Valley, teams had to roll a  globe using a set of three logs across a field before they could run to the Finish Line.

Ratings
The first season had a 23% average Jewish household rating across the season.

Notes

References

External links
Official website 

HaMerotz LaMillion seasons
2009 Israeli television seasons
Television shows filmed in Israel
Television shows filmed in South Africa
Television shows filmed in Vietnam
Television shows filmed in Japan
Television shows filmed in Hong Kong
Television shows filmed in Macau
Television shows filmed in Australia
Television shows filmed in New Zealand